The following companies are or have been known as the Seaview Railroad or Sea View Railroad:
Sea View Railroad (Brooklyn), the owner of the Brighton Beach Line and Coney Island Elevated in New York City
Sea View Railroad (Rhode Island), an interurban from Providence south to Wakefield
Seaview Transportation Company, commonly known as the Seaview Railroad, a terminal railroad in Rhode Island